Botwine (died 785 or 786) was a Northumbrian saint venerated at Ripon and Peterborough. He is well documented as a priest, and latter Abbot of Ripon.
The Anglo-Saxon Chronicle recension E,  recorded his death in the 780s (probably for 786) in one of three Ripon abbatial obits derived from a chronicle of Northumbrian origin. Following the death of St Botwine in 786AD, his replacement, Ealdberht was elected and consecrated Abbot.  Ealdberht died in 788AD, and was himself succeeded as Abbot by St. Sigered of Ripon.

The late 10th- and early 11th-century writer Byrhtferth of Ramsey in his Vita sancti Oswaldi claimed that Oswald of Worcester, Archbishop of York, discovered Botwine's relics at the monastery of Ripon. Oswald made a magnificent reliquary in which he placed the relics of Botwine with Wilfrid, Tiatberht, Alberht, Sigered and Vilden. This account is described by historian Michael Lapidge as "problematical" on other points. as it is known that in the 12th-century Peterborough Abbey also possessed some relics of Botwine.

Notes

References

External links

780s deaths
8th-century Christian saints
English abbots
English Christian monks
History of Peterborough
History of Northumberland
History of North Yorkshire
Northumbrian saints
Christianity in Cambridgeshire
Religion in Northumberland
Religion in North Yorkshire
Year of birth unknown
Burials at Peterborough Cathedral